Big Bang Theory  is the fifteenth studio album and the first covers album by the band Styx, released in 2005. It consists of cover versions of classic rock songs.

Origin
In 2004, Styx performed a cover of the Beatles song "I Am the Walrus" at Eric Clapton's Crossroads Festival, where the song was received so well that it was released as a single, reaching the Top 10 in the Mediabase Classic Rock charts. The video featured original bassist Chuck Panozzo as the "eggman". The single's success resulted in the band recording this album of cover songs. The album reached No. 46 on the Billboard Top 200 Albums chart, Styx's first time in the top 50 since 1983's Kilroy Was Here. The single "I Am The Walrus" reached a high of number 27 on the Billboard Heritage Rock Chart.

Track listing
 "I Am the Walrus" (the Beatles cover)
Lead vocals: Gowan
 "I Can See for Miles" (the Who cover)
Lead vocals: Shaw
 "Can't Find My Way Home" (Blind Faith cover)
Lead vocals: Shaw
 "It Don't Make Sense (You Can't Make Peace)" (Willie Dixon cover)
Lead vocals: Young
 "I Don't Need No Doctor" (Ray Charles cover, a la Humble Pie)
Lead vocals: Gowan
 "One Way Out" (the Allman Brothers Band cover)
Lead vocals: Shaw
 "A Salty Dog" (Procol Harum cover)
Lead vocals: Gowan
 "Summer in the City" (the Lovin' Spoonful cover)
Lead vocals: Shaw
 "Manic Depression" (the Jimi Hendrix Experience cover)
Lead vocals: Young
 "Talkin' About the Good Times" (the Pretty Things cover)
Lead vocals: Gowan
 "Locomotive Breath" (Jethro Tull cover)
Lead vocals: Young
 "Find the Cost of Freedom" (Crosby, Stills, Nash & Young cover)
Lead vocals: group
 "Wishing Well" (Free cover)
Lead vocals: Shaw
 "Blue Collar Man @ 2120" (rerecording of a Styx song)
Lead vocals: Shaw

Personnel
Styx
Tommy Shawvocals, guitars
James "JY" Youngvocals, guitars
Lawrence Gowanvocals, keyboards
Ricky Phillipsbass
Chuck Panozzobass on "Locomotive Breath"
Todd Suchermandrums

Additional musicians
The Oracle Divaguest vocals on "It Don't Make Sense (You Can't Make Peace)" and "Wishing Well"
Johnnie Johnsonpiano on "Blue Collar Man @ 2120"
Koko Taylorguest vocals on "Blue Collar Man @ 2120"

Production
Gary Loizzoproducer, engineer, remixing
Derek Downing, John Maschoff, Mike Pierceassistant engineers
Dan Stoutmastering at Colossal Mastering, Chicago

References

External links
 "I am the Walrus" video by Styx at YouTube
 Styx - Big Bang Theory (2005) album review by Rob Theakston, credits & releases at AllMusic.com
 Styx - Big Bang Theory (2005) album releases & credits at Discogs.com
 Styx - Big Bang Theory (2005) album to be listened as stream at Spotify.com

2005 albums
Covers albums
Styx (band) albums
Frontiers Records albums